Củ Chi is a township and capital of Củ Chi District, Ho Chi Minh City, Vietnam.

References

Populated places in Ho Chi Minh City
District capitals in Vietnam
Townships in Vietnam